Savinja is a district (Slovene mestna četrt) of the City Municipality of Celje and a neighborhood of the city of Celje in Slovenia. It is named after the Savinja River.

References

Geography of Celje
Districts of the City Municipality of Celje